The Antarctica cooling controversy was the result of an apparent contradiction in the observed cooling behavior of Antarctica between 1966 and 2000, which became part of the public debate in the global warming controversy, particularly between advocacy groups of both sides in the public arena including politicians, as well as the popular media. In his novel State of Fear, Michael Crichton asserted that the Antarctic data contradicted global warming. The few scientists who have commented on the supposed controversy state that there is no contradiction, while the author of the paper whose work inspired Crichton's remarks has said that Crichton misused his results. There is no similar controversy within the scientific community, as the small observed changes in Antarctica are consistent with the small changes predicted by climate models, and because the overall trend since comprehensive observations began is now known to be one of warming.

Background
Changes in the average temperature of the Antarctic continent have been the subject of various measurements. The trend differs at different locations on the continent. These trends have been labelled as "contradictory" in some accounts.
Observations unambiguously show the Antarctic Peninsula to be warming. Some trends elsewhere on the continent have shown cooling, while others show warming over the entire continent, but overall trends are smaller and dependent on season and the timespan over which the trend is computed. Climate models predict that temperature trends due to global warming will be much smaller in Antarctica than in the Arctic, mainly because heat uptake by the Southern Ocean acts to moderate the radiative forcing by greenhouse gases.

In a study released in 2009, historical weather station data was combined with satellite measurements to deduce past temperatures over large regions of the continent, and these temperatures indicate an overall warming trend. One of the paper's authors, Eric Steig of the University of Washington, stated "We now see warming is taking place on all seven of the earth’s continents in accord with what models predict as a response to greenhouse gases." A follow-up study by O'Donnell and others that strongly criticized the Steig et al. work, finding significant warming in West Antarctica but general cooling over the bulk of the continent. O'Donnell et al. also confirmed that Antarctica overall has been warming since the 1950s, but disagreed with Steig et al. about the strength of that warming. Subsequent measurements of temperatures in a borehole at the center of the West Antarctic ice sheet, by Orsi and others, found even larger positive trends than Steig et al.

UAH satellite data of temperatures of the lower troposphere since 1979 shows a slight warming over the Antarctic continent (0.4 degrees C, 1979 to 2021), and a very slight cooling over the Southern ocean to the 60th latitude. The region covered for Antarctic land and ocean combined (60S to 85S) shows a very slight warming. RSS satellite data for lower tropospheric temperatures only covers 60S to 70S for Antarctica, and shows a very slight warming (0.24 degrees C, 1979 to 2021) for this smaller region.

Over a longer time period, work by Stenni, et al. (2017) used isotope records from ice cores to compute a cooling trend in all major regions of the continent over the past 2000 years.

Origin of the controversy 

Michael Crichton, in his 2004 novel State of Fear, asserted that cooling observed in the interior of Antarctica shows the lack of reliability of the models used for global warming predictions, and thus of climate theory in general. This novel has a docudrama plot based upon the idea that there is a deliberately alarmist conspiracy behind global warming activism. As presented in page 193 of the novel: "The data show that one relatively small area called the Antarctic Peninsula is melting and calving huge icebergs. That's what gets reported year after year. But the continent as a whole is getting colder, and the ice is getting thicker." Other sources then picked up the argument, labeling it the "Antarctic Cooling Controversy", despite the fact that the small and variable observed trends are broadly consistent with the small magnitude of model-predicted temperature trends for Antarctica.

Crichton footnoted his assertion of Antarctic cooling as originating from the paper Doran et al., 2002, although the paper referenced did not directly state that their measurements was evidence against global warming. The work stated: "Although previous reports suggest slight recent continental warming our spatial analysis of Antarctic meteorological data demonstrates a net cooling on the Antarctic continent between 1966 and 2000, particularly during summer and autumn. The McMurdo Dry Valleys have cooled by 0.7 °C per decade between 1986 and 2000, with similar pronounced seasonal trends.... Continental Antarctic cooling, especially the seasonality of cooling, poses challenges to models of climate and ecosystem change."

In response to Crichton, the lead author of the research paper, Peter Doran, published a statement in The New York Times stating, "... our results have been misused as 'evidence' against global warming by Michael Crichton in his novel State of Fear.... Our study did find that 58 percent of Antarctica cooled from 1966 to 2000. But during that period, the rest of the continent was warming. And climate models created since our paper was published have suggested a link between the lack of significant warming in Antarctica and the ozone hole over that continent. These models, conspicuously missing from the climate change denial literature, suggest that as the ozone hole heals — thanks to worldwide bans on ozone-destroying chemicals — all of Antarctica is likely to warm with the rest of the planet. An inconvenient truth?" He also emphasized the need for more stations in the Antarctic continent in order to obtain more robust results.

A rebuttal to Crichton's claims was presented by the group Real Climate:

Long term temperature data from the Southern Hemisphere are hard to find, and by the time you get to the Antarctic continent, the data are extremely sparse. Nonetheless, some patterns do emerge from the limited data available. The Antarctic Peninsula, site of the now-defunct Larsen-B ice shelf, has warmed substantially. On the other hand, the few stations on the continent and in the interior appear to have cooled slightly (Doran et al., 2002; GISTEMP).

At first glance this seems to contradict the idea of "global" warming, but one needs to be careful before jumping to this conclusion. A rise in the global mean temperature does not imply universal warming. Dynamical effects (changes in the winds and ocean circulation) can have just as large an impact, locally as the radiative forcing from greenhouse gases. The temperature change in any particular region will in fact be a combination of radiation-related changes (through greenhouse gases, aerosols, ozone and the like) and dynamical effects. Since the winds tend to only move heat from one place to another, their impact will tend to cancel out in the global mean.

It is common to find statements that "climate models generally predict amplified warming in polar regions" (e.g., Doran et al.), a phenomenon called polar amplification. In fact, however, Arctic and Antarctic climates are out of phase with each other (the "polar see-saw" effect), and climate models predict amplified warming primarily for the Arctic and not for Antarctica.

Observations of trends

There are few long term weather observations for Antarctica. There are less than twenty permanent stations in all and only two in the interior. More recently AWSs supplement this, but their records are relatively brief. Hence calculation of a trend for the entire continent is difficult. Satellite observations only exist since 1981 and provide surface temperature measurements only in cloud-free conditions.

The 2007 IPCC Fourth Assessment Report states, "Observational studies have presented evidence of pronounced warming over the Antarctic Peninsula, but little change over the rest of the continent during the last half of the 20th century." Chapman and Walsh note that "Trends calculated for the 1958–2002 period suggest modest warming over much of the 60°–90°S domain. All seasons show warming, with winter trends being the largest at +0.172 °C per decade while summer warming rates are only +0.045 °C per decade. The 45-year temperature trend for the annual means is +0.082 °C per decade corresponding to a +0.371 °C temperature change over the 1958–2002 period of record. Trends computed using these analyses show considerable sensitivity to start and end dates, with trends calculated using start dates prior to 1965 showing overall warming, while those using start dates from 1966 to 1982 show net cooling over the region."
 
Several scientific sources have reported that there is a cooling trend observed in the interior of the continent for the last two decades of the 20th century, while the Antarctic Peninsula shows a warming trend.

In early 2013, David Bromwich, a professor of polar meteorology at Ohio State University, and a team including Antarctic weather station experts from the University of Wisconsin, published a paper in Nature Geoscience showing that the warming in central West Antarctica was unambiguous—and likely about twice the magnitude estimated by Steig et al. The key to Bromwich et al.'s work was the correction for errors in the temperature sensors used in various incarnations of the Byrd Station record (the only long record in this part of Antarctica); miscalibration had previously caused the magnitude of the 1990s warmth to be underestimated, and the magnitude of the 2000s to be overestimated. The revised Byrd Station record is in very good agreement with the borehole temperature data from nearby WAIS Divide. A new statistical reconstruction shows significant warming over all of West Antarctic in the annual mean, driven by significant warming over most of the region in winter and spring. Summer and fall trends, are insignificant except over the Antarctic Peninsula where they are widespread only in fall. These finding are in good agreement with the 2009 study in Nature, though in general the new results show greater warming in West Antarctica and less warming over East Antarctica as a whole. Nicholas and Bromwich argue that while the warming in East Antarctica is not statistically significant, it would be greater in magnitude if not for the ozone hole. There is no evidence that any significant region of Antarctic has been cooling over the long term, except in fall. In a 2016 paper, Turner and others point out that if one considers just the last ~18 years, the trend on the Antarctic Peninsula has been cooling. This is likely connected with tropical variability, perhaps associated with the phase of the Interdecadal Pacific Oscillation.

Scientific sources and interpretations 

According to a NASA press release:
"Across most of the continent and the surrounding Southern Ocean, temperatures climbed... The temperature increases were greater and more widespread in West Antarctica than in East Antarctica, where some areas showed little change or even a cooling trend. This variability in temperature patterns across Antarctica complicates the work of scientists who are trying to understand the relative influence of natural cycles and human-caused climate change in Antarctica."

As a complement to NASA's findings, the British Antarctic Survey, which has undertaken the majority of Britain's scientific research in the area, has the following positions:

 Ice makes polar climate sensitive by introducing a strong positive feedback loop.
 Melting of continental Antarctic ice could contribute to global sea level rise.
 Climate models predict more snowfall than ice melting during the next 50 years, but models are not good enough for them to be confident about the prediction.
 Antarctica seems to be both warming around the edges and cooling at the center at the same time. 
 Sea ice extent surrounding Antarctica has trended higher since satellite measurements began in 1979.
 The central and southern parts of the west coast of the Antarctic Peninsula have warmed by nearly 3 °C. The cause is not known.

Research by Thompson and Solomon (2002) and by Shindell and Schmidt (2004) provide explanations for the observed cooling trend during the 1970s through 2000. An updated paper by Thompson et al. (2012) emphasized that this explanation only applies to austral summer; during the fall, winter and spring seasons, the mean trend is warming, and this is believed to be largely due to changes in atmospheric circulation related to warming trends in the tropical Pacific region.

See also
Climate of Antarctica

References

Environment of Antarctica
Climate change controversies
Climate change denial
Climate of Antarctica